William McLintock may refer to:

Sir William McLintock, 1st Baronet (1873–1947), British accountant
Sir William Traven McLintock, 3rd Baronet (1931–1987) of the McLintock baronets
W. F. P. McLintock (William Francis Porter McLintock, 1887–1960), Scottish geologist and museum director